The rank insignia of the French Navy are worn on shoulder straps of shirts and white jackets, and on sleeves for navy jackets and mantels. Until 2005, only commissioned officers had an anchor on their insignia, but enlisted personnel are now receiving them as well. Although the names of the ranks for superior officers contain the word "Capitaine" (and ),  the appropriate style to address them is "", "" referring to "lieutenant de vaisseau", which is translated as lieutenant. They are assumed by officers ranking  (Vice-Admiral).

The rank of Vice-Admiral of France was formerly designated as Lieutenant-General of the Naval Armies until 1791, such as in the Levant Fleet and Flotte du Ponant of the Ancien Régime. Major of the French Navy has a similar history to that of the former Lieutenant-General of the Naval Armies.

The only  (Admiral of the Fleet) was François Darlan after he was refused the dignity of Admiral of France. Equivalent to the dignity of Marshal of France, the rank of Admiral of France remains theoretical in the Fifth Republic; it was last granted in 1869, during the Second Empire, but retained during the Third Republic until the death of its bearer in 1873.

Insignia 
The insignia below depict the configuration on shoulder boards. Shoulder straps are slightly different, notably without the golden frame for general officers.

Great officers

Officers

—  Flag officers

— Senior officers

— Junior officers

Warrant, Petty Officers and Enlisted Personnel

— Warrant and Petty Officers

—  Sailors and quarter-masters

Attributions 
Personnel with a particular attribution may wear distinctive features on their rank insignia. For instance, medical officers bear two red stripes on their insignia. Similarly, the  wear pearl-grey stripes.

, who are not employed by the navy but have a special status, wear a uniform and officer straps with rank insignia replaced with the words "".

Military chaplains

Ranks formerly used in the Navy 
  (Vice Admiral of France)
 
 
  and

See also 
 French Navy

References 

Military ranks of France
French Navy Ranks